John Scrymgeour, 3rd Viscount Dudhope and 1st Earl of Dundee (d. 1668) was a member of the Scottish nobility and fought in the Wars of the Three Kingdoms.

Biography
Scrymgeour was one of the royalist leaders during the civil war. In 1648 he joined with the Duke of Hamilton and General John Middleton, (afterwards first Earl of Middleton), in the attempt to rescue Charles I, and was present in command of a troop of horse at the battle of Preston. He succeeded in escaping to Scotland after the royalist defeat.

Scrymgeour attended Charles II at Stirling Castle in 1651, and marched with him to England on the expedition that terminated at the battle of Worcester. Again he escaped uninjured, and then he joined Middleton in the abortive campaign in the north in 1654. He was captured in the braes of Angus by a party of Cromwellian soldiers, and sent prisoner to London, where he was detained for some time.

At the Restoration his loyalty was rewarded. He was made a privy councillor and created Earl of Dundee on 8 September 1660. He died on 23 June 1668.

Family
Scrymgeour, by his marriage in 1644 with Lady Anne Ramsay, daughter of William Ramsay, 1st Earl of Dalhousie, apparently had no children, and the title was thought extinct, His widow married Sir Henry Bruce of Clackmannan, whose family is now represented by the Earl of Elgin and Kincardine. The titles, however, were successfully claimed in 1952 (Dudhope) and 1953 (Dundee) by Henry Scrymgeour-Wedderburn, 11th Earl of Dundee.

See also
Cromwell's Act of Grace

Notes

References

Attribution
 sources used by the DNB:
Douglas's Peerage, sub voce Scrymgeour;
Register of Privy Council, vols. iii–viii.
Millar's Roll of Eminent Burgesses of Dundee, pp. 49, 83, 109, 164
Scrymgeour MSS. in Dundee Charter-room;
Reg. Mag. Sig. 1546–1620
Foster's Members of Parliament of Scotland.

1668 deaths
17th-century Scottish people
Scottish soldiers
Members of the Privy Council of Scotland
Earls of Dundee
Year of birth unknown